General elections were held in Pakistan on 25 July 2018. Since the previous general election, several pollsters conducted opinion polls at both the national and provincial levels.

Graphical summaries

Nationwide voting intention

Voting intention polls conducted since 2013 for the National Assembly.

Province-wide voting intention
Voting intention polls conducted for each of the provinces. 
If a party has N/A listed in the poll, this indicates it is in the 'Others' section of the poll.
If a certain poll result is bolded, this indicates that the option has achieved over 50% of the vote.

Punjab

Sindh

Khyber Pakhtunkhwa

Balochistan

Constituency-wide voting intention
Colour key

NA-28 (Peshawar-II)

NA-63 (Rawalpindi-VII)

NA-125 (Lahore-III)

Polling on Politicians

Polling on the disqualification of Nawaz Sharif from office

Nawaz Sharif vs Imran Khan

References

2018
2018 Pakistani general election